Colfax Township is the name of some places in the U.S. state of Michigan:

 Colfax Township, Benzie County, Michigan
 Colfax Township, Huron County, Michigan
 Colfax Township, Mecosta County, Michigan
 Colfax Township, Oceana County, Michigan
 Colfax Township, Wexford County, Michigan

See also 
 Colfax Township (disambiguation)

Michigan township disambiguation pages